The costal margin, also known as the costal arch, is the lower edge of the chest (thorax) formed by the bottom edge of the rib cage.

Structure 
The costal margin is the medial margin formed by the cartilages of the seventh to tenth ribs. It attaches to the body and xiphoid process of the sternum.

The thoracic diaphragm attaches to the costal margin.

The costal angle is the angle between the left and right costal margins where they join the sternum.

Function 
The costal margins somewhat protect the higher abdominal organs, such as the liver.

Clinical significance 
The costal margin may be used for tissue harvesting of cartilage for use elsewhere in the body, such as to treat microtia.

Different abdominal organs may be palpated just below the costal margin, such as the liver on the right side of the body.

Pain across the costal margin is most commonly caused by costochondritis.

The costal paradox, also known as Hoover's sign and the costal margin paradox, is a sign where the costal angle decreases upon inspiration rather than increasing, indicating chronic obstructive pulmonary disease.

References

External links
 —"Bony landmarks of the abdomen"
 

Bones of the thorax

de:Arcus costalis